This article lists characters from the BBC crime comedy drama Death in Paradise, which began airing in 2011.

Table of character appearances

 Episode count is as of episode 12.8
Cast list is in chronological order of appearance (episode-wise) in the programme, and in the case of cast who began featuring in the programme at the same time, in credit order.
Morven Christie and James Fox both featured in voice-only for their first appearances – episodes 3.1 and 4.7, respectively. 
List consists of all main and recurring characters.

Current characters
Characters currently starring in the programme, in standard credit order:

Detective Inspector Neville Parker
 
DI Neville Parker is from Manchester in the UK and became the new Honore Police inspector after the departure of DI Jack Mooney. He initially hates everything on the island, and has severe allergies, his main allergy being mosquito bites. After he checked through the crime scene of his first murder case, he plans on catching another plane back to the UK, but his flight was cancelled by Commissioner Patterson. DI Parker moves into the shack, but in the middle of the night, he couldn't stand the mosquitoes, and checks into a hotel. After solving his first case, DI Parker collapses and is declared unfit to travel for a month. He moves back into the shack as the police budget wouldn't let him remain in the hotel. After solving a murder case in Episode 8, he plans on flying back home, but a talk with a blind actress about her attempt to face the challenges of her condition prompted Parker to change his mind and decide to stay as inspector permanently.

At the start of series 10 he has continued to struggle to adapt to life on the island, but the returning DS Florence Cassell helps him embrace Caribbean life more, and by the end of the series he warms to the island lifestyle and later develops feelings for Florence. He subsequently reveals to Florence how he feels at the start of Series 11, but despite Florence expressing her admiration and care for Neville, tells him she wishes to remain just friends and later leaves the island halfway through the series.

In the 2022 Christmas Special, Neville, having briefly tried online dating, meets Sophie Chambers, an English traveller also from Manchester who is staying on the island for a few weeks. The two bond and eventually begin a relationship by the start of Series 12. However, in Episode 6, Neville is arrested, and later charged, for the murder of David Cartwright, a suspect on a previous case who was found dead in his hotel room after Neville confronted him, due to Neville not having enough evidence to arrest him. Despite being eventually cleared of any wrongdoing, it's revealed that it was Sophie who was behind his framing; Sophie blames Neville for the suicide of her sister in prison, who Neville arrested and charged with murder on a case back in Manchester in 2018, and came to the island, under a fake name, to frame him as an act of revenge. In the aftermath of this revelation, Neville considers leaving the island in the Series 12 finale, but ultimately decides to stay.

Detective Sergeant Naomi Thomas
 
Sergeant Naomi Thomas joins the Saint Marie Police Force at the start of Series 11 as JP's replacement. She was born on a neighbouring island to Saint Marie and enrolled in the police force there where she achieved her sergeant status. However, due to the island's small size and population, Naomi had never worked on a homicide case before joining the force at Saint Marie. She is shown to be very dedicated to her job, a trait that sometimes got in the way of her professionalism, but nevertheless her enthusiasm for the job impresses her fellow officers.

Following Florence's departure from the show midway through series 11, Naomi shows her interest in becoming the new Detective Sergeant, and following discussions with DI Neville Parker and the Commissioner, she is accepted and becomes the new DS.

Officer Marlon Pryce
 
Formerly a youth offender, Marlon joins the Saint Marie Police Force in order to avoid facing going to court and prison as a consequence for a life time of bad behaviour. Upon his arrival, JP is tasked with taking Marlon under his wing.

Despite initially proving a challenge for JP, the two men soon form a good relationship when JP takes Marlon in after finding out he was sleeping on the streets. Their good relationship is further shown when JP steps in to protect Marlon following an incident with one of the suspects and offers to take the blame for his actions, in order to help him avoid going to prison. By the end of Series 10 with JP set to leave the island, Marlon has become committed to reforming his character and making something of his life, aiming to be as a good a police officer as JP. 

By the start of Series 11, Marlon has been promoted to Officer and has continued to improve in his role as Officer. Against the advice of the Commissioner, Marlon applies and takes his Sergeant exams in Series 12. He fails them and is given a dressing down by the commissioner for taking them prematurely, but nevertheless remains committed to his role.

Trainee Officer Darlene Curtis
 
Darlene first appeared in Series 7 as a love interest to Officer Dwayne Myers. The two had a sometimes turbulent but nevertheless happy relationship, though following Dwayne's departure from the island at the end of the series, it's assumed their relationship ended and Darlene makes no appearances for the next few series.

Darlene returns to the show mid-way through Series 11, and is subsequently offered a role on the team by Commissioner Patterson in a civilian capacity following Florence's departure from the force. She proves to be a good addition to the team, and at the end of the 2022 Christmas special, she reveals that she has applied for Police Officer training so she can join the team in an official capacity.

Supporting characters

Catherine Bordey 

Camille's French mother and owner of a bar where the police team often chat about the case over a drink. She makes a particularly good cup of tea, according to DI Richard Poole, although generally their relationship with each other is strained because of his prejudice toward the French. She raised Camille as a single mother and is therefore very close to her. She does not react badly when Camille confirms she is thinking of leaving, in fact, she supports Camille and respects her choices, urging her to do whatever makes her happy. When Camille leaves, she has a spare room and lets the homeless JP stay in it when Goodman finds out he has nowhere to live and is sleeping in the police cells. In Series 5 Episode 5, JP tells Catherine that he is in love with his high school crush, Rosey Fabrice, but was told not to admit this by Dwayne. This angers Catherine, who confronts Dwayne to encourage JP to be open with Rosey.

Following the resignation of Mayor Joseph Richards in a scandal at the end of Series 6, Episode 1, Catherine decides to stand as a candidate in the mayoral election to replace him. She is elected in Series 6, Episode 8 after one of the other candidates is murdered due to an old vendetta and the other is convinced to stand down from the election by the police team after they discover his hypocritical actions. During the investigation, it is strongly implied that the killers attempted to frame Catherine for the murder, but this part of the plan fails as none of the team is able to believe that Catherine would commit murder.

In Series 10, Episodes 5–6, Catherine is assaulted by an attacker owing to her links to an ongoing case, which causes her to be admitted to hospital with a serious head trauma. Her daughter Camille returns to the island to visit her and help solve the case. Catherine's condition worsens after a bleed in her brain is discovered and she subsequently requires surgery to prevent her from dying. Despite Camille fearing the worst, Catherine makes a full recovery and she and Camille decide to go away for a few weeks together to make up for Camille not visiting her since she left the island.

In Series 12, Episode 8, it is revealed that Catherine is going to be a grandmother, as Camille and her boyfriend are expecting a baby.

Commissioner Selwyn Patterson 
 
The island's police commissioner, who has risen through the ranks to become Saint Marie's top policeman, in charge of staffing. Though mainly operating in the background in most episodes, Patterson advises the team on cases of particular difficulty, or which involve political or social interest where the island's most notable figures are involved. This ranges from asking Poole to be cautious about accusing a man with a particular reputation on the island to asking Poole not to disprove the idea that a notorious pirate hid his treasure on the island. It was revealed in Series 3, Episode 3, that he had in fact broken the law once during his life, that being when he was jailed for a day over parking fines many years ago. Initially more apparently focused on political implications over individuals, such as being angered at Poole when a suspect was stabbed in the back while in Poole's custody because of the implications for public perception, he has shown signs of softening over time, such as allowing an incident where Officer Myers told a journalist that the commissioner blundered around like an old goat to be dismissed as a significant misquote, and warmly welcoming DI Jack Mooney to the island after Humphrey Goodman requests reassignment. He developed a close friendship with DI Mooney, though his relationship with DI Neville Parker is much more complicated due to the latter's more eccentric behaviours and "chaotic" methods. However, this relationship also improves over time as the commissioner notices his effectiveness and efforts to adapt. He also has a habit of appearing surprisingly quietly at the station, usually startling the detective pondering the case.

Patterson visibly considers police work to be primarily in service of the island and its people. In some early cases he would pressure the detectives to avoid damaging the island's image or causing stress to individuals who appear innocent when the angle of the investigation appears to be poorly evidenced, rather than pursuing results at all costs. Over time, however, he has adopted a more relaxed attitude in this regard, content to let the detectives follow the evidence and simply offering advice rather than attempting to 'nudge' the investigation. He is also a member of many clubs and organisations, and appears to know many people on the island personally, maintaining friendly relationships rather than using his position of power. He also visibly takes any past failures of his police work and unresolved investigations very seriously and personally, struggling to accept that a new investigation may yield better results. However, he is always willing to accept new evidence, such as the reopening of an eight-year-old murder case where it has just been revealed that the woman arrested had an alibi that went unconfirmed because her companion was visiting on holiday and left before he could be questioned, and is visibly relieved when such matters are finally resolved and the true guilty party exposed.

Very little is known throughout the show about Patterson's personal or family life until in Series 11, Episode 8, when his ex-wife, Maggie, appears on the island, who had left him years prior due to the demands of her profession as a journalist. It is revealed that although he has had other partners since, he has never remarried. Despite remaining separated for a long time, it appears they still have feelings for each other, and it is revealed at the end that her daughter, whom he never met until now, is also his daughter.

Past characters
Characters who have previously starred in a main role in the programme, in standard credit order:

Detective Inspector Richard Poole
 

A British inspector assigned to the island to investigate the previous inspector's murder, Poole was instructed to remain on the island as the new police detective, much to his dismay. Despite his distaste for the island and inexperience with tropical weather – to the point where he continues to wear his old suits and drinks almost nothing but tea – he often showed a useful knack for making deductive leaps based on minimal information and apparently random events, and favoured making arrests by addressing all the suspects at once before identifying the killer. In series 2 he grew slightly more relaxed and recommended Fidel for his sergeant's exam. Poole briefly returns to London at the end of Episode 2, but in spite of his distaste for Saint Marie, he chooses to return. Poole is murdered in the first episode of Series 3, at an on-island reunion of Cambridge university classmates, by Helen Reid, when he threatened to expose her identity theft. He was replaced by DI Humphrey Goodman.

Poole makes a brief guest cameo in Series 10, Episode 6 when Camille returns to the island briefly to help on a case and due to her mother Catherine being admitted to hospital after being attacked. He encourages her to spend more time with Catherine before disappearing, being simply a fragment of Camille's mind.

Detective Sergeant Camille Bordey 
  

A former undercover investigator, she was assigned as Detective Sergeant because her cover was blown when she was arrested during Poole's first investigation. She was the team's best investigator after Poole, often handling the computer work. Initially, she and Poole did not get along at all as a result of a culture clash, but over time the two began to get along better and made a good team, and their friendship even showed hints of romance. When Poole briefly left the island, she admitted she admired him considerably, and was pleased when he chose to return. His murder in the opening scenes of Series 3 devastated her and she was unsure about his successor, DI Humphrey Goodman, although she warmed to him over time. She was then offered an undercover job in Paris in Series 4, and she decided to leave. As she left, she kissed Humphrey despite not previously expressing emotions for him, although he had for her.

Her mother Catherine owns a popular local bar. Her father, Marlon Croft, who lives in the neighboring island of St. Lucia, reappears in Series 3, Episode 5, protecting his goddaughter, who's implicated in a case. After suspecting him, Camille starts reconciling with him.

In Series 10, Episode 6, Camille returns to the island after Commissioner Patterson contacted her to return to help on a case, and due to her mother being admitted to hospital after being attacked. She successfully helps the team solve the case and, following advice given to her after conversing with a memory of DI Richard Poole, decides to spend a few weeks away with Catherine to make up for not visiting her since leaving the island, after which she returned to her role in Paris.  

In Series 12, Episode 8, Catherine reveals that Camille and her boyfriend are expecting a baby back in Paris.

Officer Dwayne Myers

Dwayne was the longest-standing officer of the Saint Marie police force, but utterly lacked ambition, hence he never became a sergeant. He has complete faith in his seniors and perhaps too good an understanding of the criminal world on the island. Dwayne often uses unlawful means to get his job done, and has an eye for the ladies, sometimes getting distracted when on the job. He is the go-to man for any investigations into the shadier aspects of Saint Marie. It is revealed he has a sister, who locked him in a trunk for three hours when he was five years old; this led to Dwayne developing a secret fear of the dark. His parents divorced when he was very young and his father abandoned him after a few months of weekend visits, leaving Dwayne to grow up on his own.

Following DS Camille Bordey's departure halfway through Series 4, Dwayne became the last remaining original team member, apart from Commissioner Selwyn Patterson. That same episode, young Officer JP Hooper joined the team, with Dwayne taking him under his wing and mentoring him to become a good officer. Dwayne later left Saint Marie and the team after the end of Series 7. It was mentioned by Jack and JP at the start of Series 8 that Dwayne had gone on a voyage with his father, Nelson, with whom he had since become reconciled.

Dwayne makes a guest appearance in the Christmas special broadcast in 2021, where he returned to the island for Christmas. He subsequently helps out the team on a case after the force is left short staffed, after which he leaves the island for London to visit his now ill father.

Sergeant Fidel Best 

Young and hard-working, Fidel is married to a woman called Juliette and has a daughter named Rosie who was born in the Series 1 finale. He is put forward for his sergeant's exams by DI Richard Poole, in series 2, in recognition of his hard work. He passes them, and officially becomes a sergeant. Fidel often gets stressed and sticks to protocol, whereas Dwayne is the complete opposite. Nevertheless, the two were great friends.

At the start of series 4, in a phone call between him and Dwayne (his voice does not feature; the conversation is shown from Dwayne's end), it is revealed that he has been promoted and is now working on the neighbouring island of St. Lucia.

Detective Inspector Humphrey Goodman

Humphrey Goodman is a Police Detective from London who is assigned to Saint Marie after the murder of D.I. Richard Poole at the start of Series 3. Clues from Poole's investigation helped Goodman reveal the motive and the killer's identity, with Goodman commenting that Poole had essentially "solved his own murder." Goodman stayed on in Saint Marie after his wife Sally announced she would not be joining him on the Caribbean island. He became the chief inspector on the island, and took to Poole's old habit of announcing the murderer in front of all the suspects and his police team. Though he is very clumsy, often forgetting things or finding himself with nothing to take notes on, he has a knack at being able to solve murders instantly, looking at the meaning of small details, much like his predecessor. He embraced Caribbean life much more than Poole did, often dressing casually when off-duty and regularly had alcohol to drink at Catherine's bar, instead of always dressing in a full suit and drinking nothing but tea like Poole.

After declining to get back together with his ex-wife Sally at the end of Series 3, he developed feelings for his detective sergeant, Camille Bordey, often coming close to revealing his feelings for her. He tried to stop her leaving when she was offered a new job in Paris, but ultimately conceded, and the two shared a brief kiss just as she left the island. Her successor, DS Florence Cassell, also got along great with Goodman, often sharing jokes and they dedicate a drink to Camille after their first solved case. He would later develop romantic feelings for Martha Lloyd, a British tourist, and they kissed at the start of series 6. She leaves the island in Episode 4 to start her dream job in London, but after a case takes Humphrey to London he meets up with her and they reconcile. After solving the case, he decides to resign as DI on Saint Marie to remain with Martha in London. He was replaced by DI Jack Mooney (Ardal O'Hanlon)

Detective Sergeant Florence Cassell

At the age of 27, Cassell joins the team to replace Fidel as Sergeant at the start of Series 4, and later is promoted to Detective Sergeant when Camille Bordey leaves midway through the series. She works efficiently and gets along with all the team, establishing a strong connection with Goodman when she is promoted. She is sent a note by Camille in order to know how to 'control' Goodman, and they both drink to Camille after she helps solve her first case as Detective Sergeant. She is very intelligent and always observes suspects carefully for any clues. In the team's visit to the UK, Cassell proved more willing to explore little details of life in Britain than Myers, although she still found the Guinness beer too thick for her taste.

In Series 8, Florence is revealed to be in a romantic relationship with Patrice, a new character. He proposed to her in the third episode and they became engaged. However, after one of Patrice's friends was arrested for murder in the fifth episode, Cassell overheard him talking to someone on the phone about the crime, and followed him to an old boathouse, where she was shot at the end of the episode. At the beginning of episode 6, she was able to call JP and get the rest of the team there in time to get her to the hospital, but soon after they discovered Patrice had been shot dead in the boathouse - devastating Florence. The subsequent investigation confirmed that Patrice's friend had been psychologically manipulated into committing the previous murder so that the real guilty party would receive a major inheritance, clearing Patrice and his friend of wrongdoing. After talking with Jack about how he coped with the death of his wife, Florence decides to leave Saint Marie and move to Martinique with relatives to get away from the memories of Patrice, but Jack and the others assure her that her spot on the team would be open if she ever decided to come back.

In Series 10, two years on from Patrice's death, Florence returns to the island after her successor, Madeline Dumas, left to take a job opportunity in Paris, leaving the island short-staffed and prompting the Commissioner to ask for her help. She was at first unsure of the new DI, Neville Parker, but she soon warms to him and helps him embrace the Caribbean lifestyle more. In the following series, Florence is offered an undercover police job in Jamaica and, despite some hesitancy due to the memory of Patrice still being vivid, she accepts the new role and leaves the island for a second time in Series 11, Episode 4.

Sergeant JP Hooper 

Replaces Florence Cassell as a new police officer in series 4, episode 5 when she is promoted. He is 21, and the youngest member of the team. He is taken under the wing of Dwayne – a police officer who Hooper says he heard all about at police training college. He initially ended up watering the plants on his first day, because of a lack of things to do. He slept in the police cells temporarily because he could not find a place to live. Goodman found him one night, amidst much screaming and shock; Catherine, who had a spare room after Camille's departure, invited him to stay with her, an offer JP enthusiastically took up. He has a brother, who, when JP was three years old, pushed him into a swimming pool, leading to JP developing a fear of water. In series five he meets Rosey Fabrice (a girl who was in the year above him in school and he had a crush on) when she is a suspect in a murder during a charity fashion show. They soon begin dating and fall in love. Eventually, after being in a relationship for several months, JP proposes to Rosey and she gladly accepts. In the final episode of Series 5, JP and Rosey got married. In the first episode of series eight, he reveals his initials stand for Jean Pierre, when introducing himself to Florence's boyfriend, whom he mistakes for Dwayne's replacement. When Officer Ruby Patterson joined the team on series 8 episode 2, he was annoyed by her being distracted while on duty, but he has a close friendship with her. On series 9 episode 6, JP learns that his wife, Rosey is pregnant, which she told him about on their wedding anniversary. However, JP hesitated, upsetting Rosey, who kicked him out the house and he spend a night at the police station cells, and was found by Ruby the next morning. JP told Ruby about Rosey's pregnancy and Ruby advises him and he was happy to become a father. He then learns that Rosey is pregnant with twins. In the final episode of series 9, he takes and passes his Sergeant's exams.

During the course of Series 10 he takes trainee officer Marlon Pryce under his wing and his wife Rosey gives birth to two twin girls; Molly and Bethany. His impressive leadership leads to the board offering JP a head position in the police training scheme abroad, an offer which JP accepts and he leaves Saint Marie with his family to start a new life.

Detective Inspector Jack Mooney

 
A police detective inspector from London, Jack Mooney is a recent widower, his wife having died from a long illness a month prior to his first appearance, although he gives the impression that it was longer when talking with others so that people won't feel too sorry for him. Jack meets D.I. Humphrey Goodman, D.S. Florence Cassell and Officer Dwayne Myers from Saint Marie, acting as their London liaison when a case requires them to travel to London to track their suspects. After solving the case, Humphrey resigned from Saint Marie Police to stay in London to be with his girlfriend, Martha Lloyd, but nominates Jack as his successor as Saint Marie's new Detective Inspector. Initially assuming that this is just a holiday of a few weeks, Jack goes to Saint Marie with his daughter, Siobhan. While still just officially on holiday, Mooney assists the team in resolving a re-opened investigation into the death of a newspaper editor eight years ago, along with another case that exposed those responsible for murdering one of the candidates in the recent mayoral election. After solving the second case, he decides to accept an offer from Commissioner Patterson to stay on the island as detective permanently, and he and Siobhan start a new life on the island to move on from his wife's death.

When Siobhan left to go back the UK to attend university, Jack missed her dearly but remained focussed on his job and embraced the Caribbean lifestyle enthusiastically. Jack supports Florence when her fiancé Patrice was murdered and mentioned how he had to go through his wife's death, and accepts Florence's decision to leave St. Marie. When Jack video calls Siobhan, he was shocked when she told him that her boyfriend has been cheating on her. He decided to return to the UK to support her but changed his mind as he was still solving a current murder case. Jack was delighted when Commissioner Patterson arranged for Siobhan to come back to St Marie to see him.

In the first episode of series 9, Jack starts a romantic relationship with English traveller Anna, but was unsure if he was ready to move on from his late wife. Anna asked him to travel the world with her, but he was unsure if he wanted to leave the island. After some deliberation, Jack tells Anna that he won't travelling with her, but agrees to wait for her, when she reaches to London. Jack decides to return to his old life in London and depart St. Marie with Siobhan, feeling he was finally ready to face the memory of his late wife. He was replaced by DI Neville Parker.

Officer Ruby Patterson

A recent graduated officer and Commissioner Patterson's niece, who replaces Officer Dwayne Myers, Ruby Patterson joins the team in Series 8, Episode 2. She's happy and excited when she has her first murder case with her new colleagues. Her colleague, Officer JP Hooper is at first annoyed at her behaviour during duty, but since came to tolerate her enthusiasm and genuine desire to do the job. Ruby also helps JP and offered him advice after he found out his wife, Rosey Fabrice was pregnant. Ruby leaves the team after Series 9, with Commissioner Patterson stating in Series 10, Episode 1 that Madeleine had secured Ruby a secondment to Paris, one which Ruby later indicates will remain "indefinite".

Detective Sergeant Madeleine Dumas

A detective sergeant from France, replacing DS Florence Cassell. Madeline initially came to the island as an officer of Internal Affairs to investigate Florence's recent shooting and assess Mooney's competence as a detective, but after witnessing him in action, she affirmed that what happened to Florence wasn't his fault and accepted an offer to remain on the island as permanent DS. She leaves the island after Series 9, with Commissioner Patterson mentioning in Series 10, Episode 1 that she left Saint Marie after accepting a new position in Paris, where she also arranged for a secondment for Ruby.

Recurring characters
Characters who have featured in more than one episode of the programme, yet are not part of the main cast, in chronological order of appearance:

Harry the Lizard: (Series 1–present, various episodes) The animated companion to all the lead detectives, he lives at the house and likes mashed-up fruit and bugs. He was originally kept by DI Richard Poole, and later passed on to DI Humphrey Goodman. He is often asked rhetorical questions by the detectives when they are pondering details of a case or just talking about other matters. After Humphrey left, his new owners are DI Jack Mooney and his daughter Siobhan. After Jack left, DI Neville Parker became his new owner.
Aidan Miles (Adrian Dunbar): (Series 1, Episodes 7–8) A possible love interest for Catherine Bordey, until DI Richard Poole exposed him as a murderer in the Series 1 finale. He was in hiding on the island, and his name was in a puzzle compiled by his victim, hence revealing his crime.
Sally Goodman (Morven Christie): (Series 3, Episode 1 (voice only) & Episode 8) DI Goodman's wife who was originally planning to join her husband on Saint Marie, but confirmed by voicemail in the series 3 premiere that she was leaving him, wished for a divorce and would not join him. In the series 3 finale, she arrived on the island asking Humphrey to come back to her, but he declined, feeling that she had already proven that she didn't have any faith in their relationship by not coming to the island with him in the first place. She subsequently leaves heartbroken. In Series 4, Episode 8, during a conversation between Humphrey and his father, Martin Goodman, it was revealed that Sally is now engaged to a lawyer called Derek Grundy and at an event also attended by Humphrey's parents she was continually asking after Humphrey. 
Martin Goodman QC (James Fox): (Series 4, Episode 7 (voice only) & Episode 8) DI Goodman's father who came to Saint Marie in order to persuade Humphrey to return home, due to him being unimpressed with Humphrey's career and life choice, but also to get back together with his former wife, Sally. It's implied that he and Goodman have had a love-hate relationship beforehand, shown by the way Humphrey ignores his calls in Episode 7. Martin eventually concedes that Humphrey is good at his job, after he witnessed his son solve a baffling murder case, and tells him he is proud of him. He subsequently returns to the UK at the end of the episode.
Rosey Hooper (née Fabrice) (Fola Evans-Akingbola, Prisca Bakare): (Series 5 & Series 10, various episodes) Love interest of officer JP Hooper after he recognised her from school (she was in the year above him) and was a suspect in a murder at a charity fashion show. She recognised JP at the end and they had a drink together at Catherine's Bar. JP realise he's in love with Rosey and tells her how he feels. They soon began a relationship. Months later, JP proposed to Rosey and she accepts and they got married in the series finale. In Series 9, Episode 6, JP reveals that Rosey told him that she is pregnant, but JP hesitated, upsetting her, and kicked him out of the house. They make up and Rosey later calls JP and reveals to him that they're having twins. In Series 10, Rosey gives birth to twins girls, named Molly and Bethany. Rosey, JP and their daughters later leave St. Marie to start a new life after Series 10 finale. 
Martha Lloyd (Sally Bretton): (Series 5–6, various episodes) A woman who worked in a shop that DI Goodman frequented when he lived in London. Martha was travelling around before starting a new job and one of her stops was on Saint Marie. While working a case, Humphrey almost ran Martha over and they recognized each other. They each had separated from their significant others and Humphrey eventually asked Martha on a date. Humphrey missed the date because he was talking JP through his pre-wedding jitters. When JP realized what had happened, he reached out to Martha and she and Humphrey reconnected. Martha continued to travel but would return to Saint Marie to see Humphrey and they started a relationship. During her frequent visits she stayed at Humphrey's shack. During one trip, Humphrey and Martha went on a romantic trip to Hotel Cecile and the staff mistook them as a newly-wed couple. Their romantic getaway ended when a murder occurred and Martha had to leave so that Humphrey could investigate. Martha eventually returned to London to start her dream job at a newly opened restaurant, but when another case took the team to London, Humphrey visited her and was inspired to stay and be with her.
Nelson Myers (Ram John Holder): (Series 6–7, various episodes) Dwayne Myers' estranged father, who lives in London. When Dwayne goes to his aunt, Lilibeth's house to visit her, Nelson told Dwayne that Lilibeth is away and he's looking after her house. He later came to visit his son on Saint Marie, and by the time the eighth series begins, the two are on a worldwide cruise to work on rebuilding their relationship. Dwayne later reveals in the 2021 Christmas special that Nelson had fallen badly ill in the time since he left the island, with Dwayne later heading over there to visit him. 
Siobhan Mooney (Grace Stone): (Series 6–9, various episodes) Siobhan is Jack Mooney's daughter. She lives in London with her father where he works as a police detective inspector, with her mother having died a month before he meets the rest of the Saint Marie team from a long illness. When D.I. Humphrey Goodman reassigned from Saint Marie Police, Jack replaces him and he and Siobhan move to Saint Marie. She leaves in the first episode of the next series to return to the UK for university. In the final episode of series 8, she reveals in a video call to her father that her boyfriend just left her after revealing that he was cheating on her for the last few months, but when Mooney is unable to go back to the UK to offer her support to solve the current case, Commissioner Patterson arranges for Siobhan to be brought to Saint Marie in acknowledgement of her father's good work. On series 9 episode 4, Siobhan returns to St. Marie to see Jack and meets her father's new partner, Anna and they get along. After Jack solved his final case, he and Siobhan return to London.
Patrice Campbell (Leemore Marrett Jr.): (Series 8, Episodes 1–6) Patrice is Florence Cassell's boyfriend and later fiancé. He and Florence started dating before series 8. They kept their relationship private and Florence was waiting for the right time to Patrice to meet her colleagues. However, Patrice went to the police station to see Florence and met JP Hooper, who mistook Patrice for the new officer that they're expecting. After JP mentions about his former partner, Dwayne Myers of being a brilliant cop, Patrice thought Florence had a thing with Dwayne and called Florence, who confronts JP. In the end of episode 1, Patrice meets Florence's boss, Jack Mooney. In episode 3, Patrice and Florence went on a romantic trip and they come back to Saint Marie to announce that they're engaged. Patrice later became involved in a murder when his friend became a suspect. Florence overheard him talking to an unknown person on the phone, telling him to meet at an empty barn. Florence follows him, but ended up getting shot. Minutes later, Jack and the team finds Florence, and JP finds Patrice murdered. The subsequent investigation revealed that Patrice's friend was psychologically manipulated into committing the murder on behalf of someone else, clearing Patrice and his friend of wrongdoing, but Florence still departs Saint Marie to get away from the painful memories.
Anna Masani (Nina Wadia): (Series 9, Episodes 1–4) Anna is Jack Mooney's love interest in Series 9. She recently separated from her husband and went on a tourist trip to Saint Marie. She reports to Jack that she witnessed a murder suspect. Jack invites her to salsa dancing and she accepts and they dance together. Anna later kisses Jack and, despite Jack being unsure whether he was ready to move on from his deceased wife, they start a romantic relationship. Jack takes Anna on a romantic boat trip and shows her around Saint Marie. In Series 9, Episode 3, Anna asks Jack to travel the world with her, as she's leaving Saint Marie soon. Anna also meets Jack's daughter, Siobhan, and they get along instantly. In Episode 4, Jack later tells Anna that he can't travel with her, but agrees to wait for her when she reaches London. Anna agrees and says goodbye to Jack before leaving Saint Marie.
Izzy Parker (Kate O'Flynn): (Series 11, Episodes 5–7) Izzy is DI Neville Parker's sister who came to visit the island in Series 11, Episode 5. It's implied that she and Neville have had a love-hate relationship beforehand given how Neville speaks negatively of her, and this is further exemplified when she holds a party at Neville's shack without his permission and makes a mess, much to his dismay. Eventually Izzy reveals that she came to the island due to her suspecting she is pregnant with her boyfriend Mike's child, but is unsure whether she wants to stay with him and get married. Eventually decides to keep the baby and get married to Mike in Episode 7, thus leaving the island with she and Neville now on good terms. It's revealed (over the phone) in the 2022 Christmas special that Izzy gave birth to a boy named Arthur.
Sophie Chambers / Rebecca Wanslow (Chelsea Edge): (2022 Christmas Special; Series 12, Episodes 1–2, 5–8) Sophie is Neville Parker's love interest, first introduced in the 2022 Christmas Special. She is visiting the island for a few weeks and stays in Catherine's spare room. Though both she and Neville's romantic inexperience makes the initial meeting between the two difficult, the two later warm to each other and have Christmas dinner together. Sophie later asks Neville on a date in Series 12, Episode 1, and the two begin a relationship shortly afterwards. Sophie returns home in Episode 2 but returns in Episode 5. Following Neville's wrongful arrest for murder in Episode 6, it's revealed that she had framed Neville, due to her holding him responsible for the suicide of her sister in prison, who was charged by Neville with murder on a case in Manchester in 2018; she came to the island under a fake name (her real name is Rebecca Wanslow) to enact her plan. She is subsequently arrested and charged for David Cartwright's murder.
Detective Constable Andrew Buckley (Kent Riley): (Series 12, Episodes 3 & 7) A former colleague of Neville Parker from the Manchester MET Police, he first appears in Episode 3 when Neville video calls him for assistance on a case. He later calls him again stating that there was something he wanted to tell Neville but couldn't at the time. It's revealed in Episode 7 that he had fled to the island after it was uncovered that he was under investigation for corruption on a previous case (involving Sophie's sister) that he and Neville worked on. He admits to taking bribes to cover his debts and is formally arrested and charged.

Further pages

Death in Paradise
List of Death in Paradise episodes

Notes

References

External links
 
 http://www.bbc.co.uk/programmes/profiles/5NBydTwDZryNHPG17f3lLBp/characters

 
Lists of British television series characters
Lists of crime television characters
Lists of drama television characters
Characters